The Lord Great Chamberlain of England is the sixth of the Great Officers of State, ranking beneath the Lord Keeper of the Privy Seal and above the Lord High Constable. The Lord Great Chamberlain has charge over the Palace of Westminster (though since the 1960s his personal authority has been limited to the royal apartments and Westminster Hall).

The Lord Great Chamberlain also has a major part to play in royal coronations, having the right to dress the monarch on coronation day and to serve the monarch water before and after the coronation banquet, and also being involved in investing the monarch with the insignia of rule.

On formal state occasions, he wears a distinctive scarlet court uniform and bears a gold key and a white staff as the insignia of his office.

Officeholders
The position is a hereditary one, held since 1780 in gross.
At any one time, a single person actually exercises the office of Lord Great Chamberlain.
The various individuals who hold fractions of the Lord Great Chamberlainship are technically each Joint Hereditary Lord Great Chamberlain.
The Joint Hereditary Lord Great Chamberlains choose one individual of the rank of a knight or higher to be the Deputy Lord Great Chamberlain.
Under an agreement made in 1912, the right to exercise the office for a given reign rotates between three families (of the then three joint office holders) in proportion to the fraction of the office held.
For instance, the Marquesses of Cholmondeley hold one-half of the office, and may therefore exercise the office or appoint a deputy every alternate reign.
Whenever one of the three shares of the 1912 agreement is split further, the joint heirs of this share have to agree among each other, who should be their deputy or any mechanism to determine who of them has the right to choose a deputy.

The office of Lord Great Chamberlain is distinct from the non-hereditary office of Lord Chamberlain of the Household, a position in the monarch's household. This office arose in the 14th century as a deputy of the Lord Great Chamberlain to fulfil the latter's duties in the Royal Household, but now they are quite distinct.

The House of Lords Act 1999 removed the automatic right of hereditary peers to sit in the House of Lords, but the Act provided that a hereditary peer exercising the office of Lord Great Chamberlain (as well as the Earl Marshal) be exempt from such a rule, in order to perform ceremonial functions.

History of the office 

The office was originally held by Robert Malet, a son of one of the leading companions of William the Conqueror. In 1133, however, King Henry I declared Malet's estates and titles forfeit, and awarded the office of Lord Great Chamberlain to Aubrey de Vere, whose son was created Earl of Oxford. Thereafter, the Earls of Oxford held the title almost continuously until 1526, with a few intermissions due to the forfeiture of some Earls for treason. In 1526, however, the fourteenth Earl of Oxford died, leaving his aunts as his heirs. The earldom was inherited by a more distant heir-male, his second cousin. The Sovereign (at that time Henry VIII) then decreed that the office belonged to the Crown, and was not transmitted along with the earldom. The Sovereign appointed the fifteenth Earl to the office, but the appointment was deemed for life and was not hereditary. The family's association with the office was  interrupted in 1540, when the fifteenth earl died and Thomas Cromwell, the King's chief adviser, was appointed Lord Great Chamberlain. After Cromwell's attainder and execution later the same year, the office passed through a few more court figures, until 1553, when it was passed back to the De Vere family, the sixteenth Earl of Oxford, again as an uninheritable life appointment. Later, Queen Mary I ruled that the Earls of Oxford were indeed entitled to the office of Lord Great Chamberlain on an hereditary basis.

Thus, the sixteenth, seventeenth and eighteenth Earls of Oxford held the position on a hereditary basis until 1626, when the eighteenth Earl died, again leaving a distant relative as heir male, but a closer one as a female heir. The House of Lords eventually ruled that the office belonged to the heir general, Robert Bertie, 14th Baron Willoughby de Eresby, who later became Earl of Lindsey. The office remained vested in the Earls of Lindsey, who later became Dukes of Ancaster and Kesteven. 

In 1779, however, the fourth Duke of Ancaster and Kesteven died, leaving two sisters as female heirs, and an uncle as an heir male. The uncle became the fifth and last Duke, but the House of Lords ruled that the two sisters were jointly Lord Great Chamberlain and could appoint a Deputy to fulfil the functions of the office. The barony of Willoughby de Eresby went into abeyance between the two sisters, but the Sovereign terminated the abeyance and granted the title to the elder sister, Priscilla Bertie, 21st Baroness Willoughby de Eresby. The office of Lord Great Chamberlain, however, was divided between Priscilla and her younger sister Georgiana. Priscilla's share was eventually split between two of her granddaughters, and has been split several more times since then. By contrast, Georgiana's share has been inherited by a single male heir each time; that individual has in each case been the Marquess of Cholmondeley, a title created for Georgiana's husband.

20th and 21st centuries
In 1902 it was ruled by the House of Lords that the then joint office holders (the 1st Earl of Ancaster, the 4th Marquess of Cholmondeley, and the Earl Carrington, later Marquess of Lincolnshire) had to agree on a deputy to exercise the office, subject to the approval of the Sovereign. Should there be no such agreement, the Sovereign should appoint a deputy until an agreement is reached.

In 1912 an agreement was reached. The office, or right to appoint the person to exercise the office, would thereafter rotate among the three joint office holders and their heirs after them, changing at the start of each successive reign. Cholmondeley and his heirs would serve in every other reign; Ancaster and Carrington would each serve once in four reigns.

As the Cholmondeley share and the Ancaster share (held since 1983 by the Baroness Willoughby de Eresby) are not further split, each of these holders decides in his or her turn to act as Lord Great Chamberlain or to name a person who will act as Lord Great Chamberlain. The Carrington share was divided at his death among his five daughters and their heirs, and has since been further divided, with 11 people holding shares as of September 2022. At accession of Charles III the turn fell to the Carrington heirs who named their cousin Rupert Carington, 7th Baron Carrington to act as Lord Great Chamberlain. Being descended from the Earl's younger brother he himself has no share of the office.

Lord Great Chamberlains, 1130–1779

Joint hereditary Lord Great Chamberlains, 1780–present
The fractions show the holder's share in the office, and the date they held it. The current holders of the office are shown in bold face.

Persons exercising the office of Lord Great Chamberlain, 1780–present

References

External links 
 www.debretts.com
 1965 decisions regarding the Lord Great Chamberlain's responsibilities in the Palace of Westminster
 Planning Act 2008, s. 227(5)(h,i)
 Principal Office Holders in the House of Lords. House of Lords Library Note (LLN 2015/007), includes a very brief overview of the Lord Great Chamberlain
 www.cracroftspeerage.co.uk
 UK Parliamentary Archives, Records of the Lord Great Chamberlain

Constitution of the United Kingdom
Ceremonial officers in the United Kingdom